Cornelia Seibeld (born 1974) is a German politician of the Christian Democratic Union (CDU). Since 2016, she has been the vice president of the Abgeordnetenhaus of Berlin. She has been a member of the Abgeordnetenhaus since 2006.

Life and education
Seibeld grew up in the West Berlin neighbourhood of Schöneberg and attended the Barnim and Fläming elementary schools. She graduated from the Walter-Rathenau-Gymnasium in 1994. Afterwards she studied law at the Free University of Berlin until 1999 and, after completing her law examinations in 1999 and 2001, began working as a lawyer in 2002. She specialises in construction and architecture. She has a son with fellow CDU politician Sven Rissmann.

Political career
Seibeld joined the CDU and the Steglitz-Zehlendorf branch of the Young Union in 1996. In 2005, she became deputy chair of the Steglitz-Zehlendorf CDU. She was also previously secretary of the municipal CDU associations in Wannsee and Lilienthal.

Seibeld was elected to the Abgeordnetenhaus of Berlin in the 2006 Berlin state election, winning the constituency of Steglitz-Zehlendorf 4. In the 2006–2011 term, she was CDU spokeswoman for legal policy. From 2010–11, she was also deputy leader of the CDU parliamentary group. She was re-elected in 2011 and became spokeswoman for religious policy in 2013. She was also a member of the Committee for the Constitution, Legal Affairs, Consumer Protection, and Rules of Procedure. She was also an assessor in the Abgeordnetenahus presidium.

After the 2016 Berlin state election, Seibeld was elected as vice president of the Abgeordnetenhaus. She also joined the Committee for Integration, Labour and Social Affairs. She was re-elected both to the Abgeordnetenhaus and as vice president after the 2021 Berlin state election.

References

External links

1974 births
Living people
People from Berlin
Christian Democratic Union of Germany politicians
Members of the Abgeordnetenhaus of Berlin
21st-century German politicians
21st-century German women politicians